There are a number of sexual offences under the law of England and Wales, the law of Scotland, and the law of Northern Ireland (which function as three separate systems for this purpose).

Rape is defined the same way for all three legal systems as:

It is therefore only legally possible for a cis woman to be guilty of rape if they assist a male assailant in an attack on a third party. Otherwise, a female can be charged with assault by penetration, which carries similar sentences to rape. If a man has sex with someone under the age of 16 then he is also guilty of rape as a child cannot lawfully consent to sex.

Of women aged 16 to 59 in England & Wales interviewed for the 2006/07 British Crime Survey, 0.5% (1 in every 200) reported that they had suffered rape or attempted rape in the previous year, equating to approximately 85,000 nationally. In the same year, less than 800 persons were convicted of rape.

England and Wales
The following offences are created for England and Wales by the Sexual Offences Act 2003:
Rape (s.1)
Assault by penetration (s.2)
Sexual assault (s.3)
Causing a person to engage in sexual activity without consent (s.4)
Rape of a child under 13 (s.5)
Assault of a child under 13 by penetration (s.6)
Sexual assault of a child under 13 (s.7)
Causing or inciting a child under 13 to engage in sexual activity (s.8)
Sexual activity with a child (s.9)
Causing or inciting a child to engage in sexual activity (s.10)
Engaging in sexual activity in the presence of a child (s.11)
Causing a child to watch a sexual act (s.12)
Child sex offences committed by children or young persons (s.13)
Arranging or facilitating the commission of a child sex offence (s.14)
Meeting a child following sexual grooming etc. (s.15)
Abuse of position of trust: sexual activity with a child (s.16)
Abuse of position of trust: causing or inciting a child to engage in sexual activity (s.17)
Abuse of position of trust: sexual activity in the presence of a child (s.18)
Abuse of position of trust: causing a child to watch a sexual act (s.19)
Sexual activity with a child family member (s.25)
Inciting a child family member to engage in sexual activity (s.26)
Sexual activity with a person with a mental disorder impeding choice (s.30)
Causing or inciting a person, with a mental disorder impeding choice, to engage in sexual activity (s.31)
Engaging in sexual activity in the presence of a person with a mental disorder impeding choice (s.32)
Causing a person, with a mental disorder impeding choice, to watch a sexual act (s.33)
Inducement, threat or deception to procure sexual activity with a person with a mental disorder (s.34)
Causing a person with a mental disorder to engage in or agree to engage in sexual activity by inducement, threat or deception (s.35)
Engaging in sexual activity in the presence, procured by inducement, threat or deception, of a person with a mental disorder (s.36)
Causing a person with a mental disorder to watch a sexual act by inducement, threat or deception (s.37)
Care workers: sexual activity with a person with a mental disorder (s.38)
Care workers: causing or inciting sexual activity (s.39)
Care workers: sexual activity in the presence of a person with a mental disorder (s.40)
Care workers: causing a person with a mental disorder to watch a sexual act (s.41)
Paying for sexual services of a child (s.47)
Causing or inciting child prostitution or pornography (s.48)
Controlling a child prostitute or a child involved in pornography (s.49)
Arranging or facilitating child prostitution or pornography (s.50)
Causing or inciting prostitution for gain (s.52)
Controlling prostitution for gain (s.53)
Trafficking into the UK for sexual exploitation (s.57)
Trafficking within the UK for sexual exploitation (s.58)
Trafficking out of the UK for sexual exploitation (s.59)
Administering a substance with intent (s.61)
Committing an offence with intent to commit a sexual offence (s.62)
Trespass with intent to commit a sexual offence (s.63)
Sex with an adult relative: penetration (s.64)
Sex with an adult relative: consenting to penetration (s.65)
Exposure (s.66)
Voyeurism (s.67)
Intercourse with an animal (s.69)
Sexual penetration of a corpse (s.70)
Sexual activity in a public lavatory (s.71)

For other offences, see Prostitution in the United Kingdom.

Abolished offences
See History of English criminal law#Sexual Offences

Northern Ireland
The following offences are created by the Sexual Offences (Northern Ireland) Order 2008:
Rape (art. 5)
Assault by penetration (art. 6)
Sexual assault (art. 7)
Causing a person to engage in sexual activity without consent (art. 8)
Rape of a child under 13 (art. 12)
Assault of a child under 13 by penetration (art. 13)
Sexual assault of a child under 13 (art. 14)
Causing or inciting a child under 13 to engage in sexual activity (art. 15)
Sexual activity with a child (art. 16)
Causing or inciting a child to engage in sexual activity (art. 17)
Engaging in sexual activity in the presence of a child (art. 18)
Causing a child to watch a sexual act (art. 19)
Sexual offences against children committed by children or young persons (art. 20)
Arranging or facilitating commission of a sex offence against a child (art. 21)
Meeting a child following sexual grooming etc. (art. 22)
Abuse of position of trust: sexual activity with a child (art. 23)
Abuse of position of trust: causing or inciting a child to engage in sexual activity (art. 24)
Abuse of position of trust: sexual activity in the presence of a child (art. 25)
Abuse of position of trust: causing a child to watch a sexual act (art. 26)
Sexual activity with a child family member (art. 32)
Inciting a child family member to engage in sexual activity (art. 33)
Paying for sexual services of a child (art. 37)
Causing or inciting child prostitution or pornography (art. 38)
Controlling a child prostitute or a child involved in pornography (art. 39)
Arranging or facilitating child prostitution or pornography (art. 40)
Indecent photographs of persons aged 16 or 17 (art. 42)
Sexual activity with a person with a mental disorder impeding choice (art. 43)
Causing or inciting a person, with a mental disorder impeding choice, to engage in sexual activity (art. 44)
Engaging in sexual activity in the presence of a person with a mental disorder impeding choice (art. 45)
Causing a person, with a mental disorder impeding choice, to watch a sexual act (art. 46)
Inducement, threat or deception to procure sexual activity with a person with a mental disorder (art. 47)
Causing a person with a mental disorder to engage in or agree to engage in sexual activity by inducement, threat or deception (art. 48)
Engaging in sexual activity in the presence, procured by inducement, threat or deception, of a person with a mental disorder (art. 49)
Causing a person with a mental disorder to watch a sexual act by inducement, threat or deception (art. 50)
Care workers: sexual activity with a person with a mental disorder (art. 51)
Care workers: causing or inciting sexual activity (art. 52)
Care workers: sexual activity in the presence of a person with a mental disorder (art. 53)
Care workers: causing a person with a mental disorder to watch a sexual act (art. 54)
Loitering or soliciting for purposes of prostitution (art. 59)
Kerb-crawling (art. 60)
Persistent soliciting (art. 61)
Causing or inciting prostitution for gain (art. 62)
Controlling prostitution for gain (art. 63)
Keeping a brothel used for prostitution (art. 64)
Administering a substance with intent (art. 65)
Committing an offence with intent to commit a sexual offence (art. 66)
Trespass with intent to commit a sexual offence (art. 67)
Sex with an adult relative: penetration (art. 68)
Sex with an adult relative: consenting to penetration (art. 69)
Exposure (art. 70)
Voyeurism (art. 71)
Intercourse with an animal (art. 73)
Sexual penetration of a corpse (art. 74)
Sexual activity in a public lavatory (art. 75)

Scotland
The following offences are created by the Sexual Offences (Scotland) Act 2009:
Rape (s.1)
Sexual assault by penetration (s.2)
Sexual assault (s.3)
Sexual coercion (s.4)
Coercing a person into being present during a sexual activity (s.5)
Coercing a person into looking at a sexual image (s.6)
Communicating indecently etc. (s.7)
Sexual exposure (s.8)
Voyeurism (s.9)
Administering a substance for sexual purposes (s.11)
Rape of a young child (s.18)
Sexual assault on a young child by penetration (s.19)
Sexual assault on a young child (s.20)
Causing a young child to participate in a sexual activity (s.21)
Causing a young child to be present during a sexual activity (s.22)
Causing a young child to look at a sexual image (s.23)
Communicating indecently with a young child etc. (s.24)
Sexual exposure to a young child (s.25)
Voyeurism towards a young child (s.26)
Having intercourse with an older child (s.28)
Engaging in penetrative sexual activity with or towards an older child (s.29)
Engaging in sexual activity with or towards an older child (s.30)
Causing an older child to participate in a sexual activity (s.31)
Causing an older child to be present during a sexual activity (s.32)
Causing an older child to look at a sexual image (s.33)
Communicating indecently with an older child etc. (s.34)
Sexual exposure to an older child (s.35)
Voyeurism towards an older child (s.36)
Older children engaging in sexual conduct with each other (s.37)
Sexual abuse of trust (s.42)
Sexual abuse of trust of a mentally disordered person (s.46)

For other offences, see Prostitution in the United Kingdom

Offences under the former law:
Rape.
Clandestine injury to women (e.g. sex with a sleeping woman).
Indecent assault.
Sexual intercourse with a girl over 12 but under 13, s.3(1) of the Sexual Offences (Scotland) Act 1976 (c.67); and with a girl over 13 but under 16, s.4(1) of the same Act.
Lewd, indecent or libidinous practices, common law; with a girl over 12 but under 16, s.5 of the 1976 Act.
Child pornography, ss.52 and 52A of the Civic Government (Scotland) Act 1982 (c.45).
Gross and shameless indecency between males, s.80(7) of the Criminal Justice (Scotland) Act 1980 (c.62); formerly s.7 of the 1976 Act.
Incest, s.2A. of the 1976 Act (added by the Incest and Related Offences (Scotland) Act 1986 (c.36), s.1; formerly the Incest Act 1567 (c.15).
Intercourse with a stepchild, s.2B of the 1976 Act (added by the 1986 Act).
Bestiality.

See also
Rape statistics
Crime in the United Kingdom

References

External links
Project Sapphire — Metropolitan Police

Offences
Crime in the United Kingdom by type